Factory 81 were an American nu metal band from Detroit, Michigan, United States. Formed in 1997, the band was active until 2003.

Biography 

The band had not initially decided on a name until Nathan Wallace wore a shirt bearing a patch which read "Factory 81", and the rest of the band thought that "it sounded good", deciding that this would be the  name of their band.

Factory 81 released their only album, Mankind in 1999 on Medea Records; while it did not chart, it was reissued by The Orchard in 2000 and Universal Motown Republic Group on October 3, 2000. In 2001, the album was reissued by the independent record label Mojo Records. Factory 81 also appeared on the compilation Take a Bite Outta Rhyme: A Rock Tribute to Rap, contributing a cover of Cypress Hill's "Insane in the Brain". The compilation peaked at No. 195 on the Billboard 200. In November 2000, Factory 81 toured alongside Mudvayne, Kittie and Apartment 26. The band signed to Jive Records, but left the label in 2002. In 2003, bassist Kevin Lewis and drummer Andy Cyrulnik left the group, prompting Factory 81 to disband.

In 2017, Bill Schultz and Kevin Lewis started a new band, Minus Knives, along with singer Brandon Espinoza, and drummer Greg Wroblewski.

Musical style and influences
AllMusic described Factory 81's music style as a fusion of "stomp-paced metal" and "'new school' hardcore", and as mosh metal. Influences cited by the band include genres such as jazz, fusion, and world music, and the band Tool. Factory 81's sound has been compared to bands such as Deftones while vocalist Nathan Wallace's rapping has been compared to that of Rage Against the Machine's Zack de la Rocha.

Band members
 Andy Cyrulnik — drums
 Kevin Lewis — bass
 Bill Schultz — guitar
 Nathan Wallace — vocals

Discography
Studio albums
Mankind (1999)
Factory 81 (2019)

Demos
Crawl Space (1997)
Midwest (2006)

Singles
Nanu (2000)

References

American nu metal musical groups
Heavy metal musical groups from Michigan
Musical groups established in 1997
Musical groups disestablished in 2003
Musical groups from Detroit
1997 establishments in Michigan